This article is a list of Maltese artists.
Vincent Apap (1909–2003), sculptor
Willie Apap (1918–1970), painter
Norbert Francis Attard (born 1951), architect, sculptor, and painter
Esprit Barthet (1919–1999), painter
Ġanni Bonnici (1932–2019), sculptor
John Busuttil Leaver (born 1964), painter
Isabelle Borg (1959–2010), painter and mixed media artist
Joseph Borg (1942–2016), painter, master printmaker and mixed media artist
Emmanuel Briffa (1875–1955), theater decorator
Tony Briffa (artist) (born 1959)
Marco Brown (born 1969), abstract artist
Samuel Bugeja (1920-2004), Sculptor, painter and art restorer. https://samuelbugeja.com/index.html
Gio Nicola Buhagiar (1698–1752), painter
Giuseppe Calì (1846–1930), painter
Antoine Camilleri (1922–2005), painter and mixed media artist
Gabriel Caruana (1929–2018), ceramic artist
Debbie Caruana Dingli (born 1962), painter
Edward Caruana Dingli (1876-1950) painter
Robert Caruana Dingli (1881 - 1940) painter
Joseph Chetcuti (1960-2019), Sculptor and bronzesmith
Emvin Cremona (1919–1987), painter and stamp designer
Stiefnu De Battista (born 1985), visual artist
Maria de Dominici (1645–1703) Baroque painter
Vincenzo Dimech (1768–1831), sculptor
 Damian Ebejer (born in 1961), painter
Alessio Erardi (1669–1727), painter
Pietro Erardi (1644–1727), painter and chaplain
Stefano Erardi (1630–1716), painter
Sef Farrugia (born 1988), fashion designer
Melchiorre Gafà (1636–1667), sculptor
Maxim Gauci (1774–1854), lithographer
Paul Gauci (19th century), lithographer of Maltese descent
Mariano Gerada (1766–1823), sculptor
Pawlu Grech (1938–2021), painter and music composer
Anna Grima (born 1958), painter
Mark Mallia (born 1965), painter and sculptor
Andrew Micallef (born 1969), painter and musician
Kris Micallef (born 1988), photographer
Francesco Noletti (1611–1654), baroque painter of still lifes and painted tapestries
Mary de Piro (born 1946), painter
Lazzaro Pisani (1854–1932), painter
Ray Piscopo (born 1954), engineer, visual artist
Frank Portelli (1922–2004), painter and designer
Pierre Portelli (born 1961), visual artist
Amedeo Preziosi (1816–1882), painter
Alberto Pullicino (1719–1759), painter
Giorgio Pullicino (1779–1851), painter and architect
Antonio Sciortino (1879–1947), sculptor
Enrique Tabone (born 1987), artist and designer
Ritty Tacsum (born 1990), visual artist
Pietro Paolo Troisi (1686–1743), Baroque sculptor, silversmith, medallist, designer, engraver and Master of the Mint
Gianni Vella (1885–1977), painter
Francesco Zahra (1710–1773), painter
 Jean Zaleski (1920–2010) Maltese-American painter
Carlo Zimech (1696–1766), priest and painter
Isabel "Izzy" Warrington (born 1968), artist, caricaturist, actress

References